The 1916 Alabama Crimson Tide football team (variously "Alabama", "UA" or "Bama") represented the University of Alabama in the 1916 college football season. It was the Crimson Tide's 24th overall and 21st season as a member of the Southern Intercollegiate Athletic Association (SIAA). The team was led by head coach Thomas Kelley, in his second year, and played their home games at University Field in Tuscaloosa and at Rickwood Field in Birmingham, Alabama. They finished the season with a record of six wins and three losses (6–3 overall, 4–3 in the SIAA).

Game summaries
Three brothers, Dexter, Walter, and Jack Hovater, were starters for the 1916 Tide.

Alabama opened the season with six consecutive victories over Birmingham College and Southern College (now combined as Birmingham–Southern College), Mississippi College, Florida, Ole Miss and Sewanee. In those six games, Alabama outscored their opponents by a margin of 156 to 13.  Sewanee almost beat Bama after making two interceptions and stopping Bama on 4th and goal at the 1, but Alabama scored late and kicked the extra point (Sewanee's having failed) for the victory. The defeat of Ole Miss was thanks to a late rally.

However, they were shut out in the final three games with losses to Georgia Tech, Tulane and Georgia to finish with an overall record of 6–3.  Georgia Tech held Alabama to two first downs and 60 yards of offense.

Schedule

Personnel

Varsity letter winners

Coaching staff

References
General

 

Specific

Alabama
Alabama Crimson Tide football seasons
Alabama Crimson Tide football